Helicopters New Zealand or HNZ was a New Zealand-based helicopter operator serving the oil and gas, EMS and government markets. Operating a mix of light and medium turbine-engined helicopters, it performed helicopter transport and air work for a number of private and government clients across Australia, New Zealand, Southeast Asia and Antarctica.

History

Founded in 1955 in Timaru, New Zealand, Helicopters New Zealand commenced operations with a Bell 47, conducting agricultural operations on the New Zealand South Island. The company grew and started providing helicopter air work services for the Government of New Zealand and oil and gas clients in the 1960s.

In 1992, Helicopters New Zealand bought West Coast Helicopters renaming it Helicopters (Australia) Pty Ltd and obtained a foothold in the Australian Helicopter market.

In 2011, HNZ was purchased by Canadian Helicopters. In 2012, Canadian Helicopters Group Inc., the parent company for Canadian Helicopters and HNZ, changed its name to HNZ Group Inc.

HNZ Group Inc's operations in the Pacific were sold to Petroleum Helicopters International in October 2017.  The remainder of HNZ Group Inc. was taken private and continued operations as Canadian Helicopters Limited.

Clients
HNZ operated on behalf of the following organizations:

 Shell-Todd Oil (Oil & Gas)
 Rio Tinto (Pilot Transfers)
 FESA WA (Firebombing)
 Origin Energy (Oil & Gas)
 Esso (Oil & Gas)

Fleet

Helicopters (NZ) fleet 1955 to 2006

As of April 2012, the HNZ fleet consisted of over 45 aircraft:

  15 x Eurocopter AS350 Series
  2 x Eurocopter EC135 Series
  1 x Eurocopter EC130 Series
  3 x Eurocopter EC145 Series
  3 x AgustaWestland AW139 Series
  4 x Bell 412 Series
  3 x AW109SP

References

Helicopter airlines
Airlines of New Zealand
Airlines established in 1955
1955 establishments in New Zealand
Nelson, New Zealand